Mawete João Baptista is a former Angolan ambassador and provincial governor.

References

Angolan diplomats
Living people
Ambassadors of Angola to Algeria
Ambassadors of Angola to Cuba
Ambassadors of Angola to the Democratic Republic of the Congo
Ambassadors of Angola to Italy
Ambassadors of Angola to Portugal
Governors of Cabinda
Governors of Uíge
1968 births